The Nest Club was a cabaret in Harlem, more specifically an afterhours club, at 169 West 133rd Street – a street known then both as "Swing Street" and "Jungle Alley" – two doors east of Seventh Avenue, downstairs. The club, operating under the auspices of The Nest Club, Inc., was founded in 1923, co-owned, and operated by John C. Carey (né John Clifford Carey; 1889–1956) and Mal Frazier (né Melville Hunter Frazier; 1888–1967). The club flourished through 1933. The U.S. Prohibition — a nationwide ban on the sale of alcoholic beverages — ran from 1920 to 1933.  The club faced a formidable challenge to its viability following the Great Crash of October 1929, followed by the Great Depression that bottomed around March 1933.

History 
 

Performers, dressed in bird costumes, did a routine in the theme, "Where do the birds go every night? To the nest! To the nest!" Dance historian Jacqui Malone, in her 1996 book, Steppin' on the Blues: The Visible Rhythms of African American Dance, explained that, at the Nest Club, floor shows were less elaborate than those of larger venues while the emphasis was on the music.

Johnnie Cobb managed the Nest Club from about 1923 to about 1926. Jeff Blood managed it beginning 1927. James Sampson (né James Thomas Sampson; 1876–1948) was business manager. A barbecue restaurant, owned and operated by Carey and Frazier, occupied the ground floor. In 1924, Carey and Frazier also opened on October 23, 1924, and operated the Bamville Club in Harlem at 65 West 129th Street, 2 doors east of Lenox Avenue – where blacks and whites danced in mixed couples.

In 1932, the Rhythm Club, which had been located at 168 West 132nd Street, moved to a room behind the Nest Club. The Nest Club itself closed in 1933.

In 1933, Dickie Wells (né Richard Wells; 1907–1949) (not the trombonist by the same name) took over the lease and opened the Shim Sham Club.

Carey and Frazier, later, owned and operated the Saratoga Club, on Lenox at 140th Street, which had been founded by Casper Holstein (1876–1944).

Selected musicians, including houseband members

Billie Holiday 
In the late 1920s, Billie Holiday, under her birth name, Eleanora Fagan, sang for tips at small Harlem venues, namely the Nest Club, Pod's and Jerry's, the Yeah Man (1925–1960) at 2350 Seventh Avenue at 138th Street, and Monette's at 148 West 133rd (1926– ). Microphones to amplify vocalist were not yet used in Harlem nightclubs.

Mae Barnes, a singer and dancer, reminisced about the first time she heard Eleanora sing. Both she and Eleanora had been performing at the Nest. Barnes said, "Billie wasn't doing her own style. She was doing everything that Louis Armstrong was doing. She knew his records backwards She wasn't imitatin' his style, she was using all his numbers. That was her beginnin' of changing Louis's style to her own "

She had this heavy voice, this gravelly tone. While at the Nest Club, Eleanora changed her name to Billie Holiday, drawing on the pseudonym of one her favorite actors, Billie Dove, and the surname of her father, Clarence Holiday. Side note: Music writer Donald Clarke avers that Holiday adopted her first name from a jazz vocal team, Billie Haywood (1903–1979) and Cliff Allen who, had been singing at a Harlem venue. Haywood was, according to Barnes, a hell of a rhythm singer.

Radio broadcasts 
In 1925, the Nest Club Orchestra, directed by Billy Butler, nationally broadcast their performances Tuesday and Saturday evenings, 11:30 to midnight, from host WFBH, a short-lived Manhattan radio station in existence from July 15, 1924, to November 6, 1926.

Prohibition 
During the Prohibition, many cabarets across the country were speakeasies. And, at the time, many in Harlem's Swing Street district have been chronicled as having been controlled by organized crime.The extent to which the Nest Club operated (i) as a speakeasy or (ii) under the duress of organized crime is not well-chronicled. 

However, Michael Aloysius Lerner, in his 2007 book, Dry Manhattan: Prohibition in New York City, pointed out that the Amsterdam News and the New York Age both argued that cabarets in Harlem had been unfairly targeted by prohibition enforcement officers. Yet, not a single venue in Harlem had been padlocked until September 1928, when the Nest Club was closed for violating the Volstead Act. When Police Commissioner Grover Whalen ordered a massive citywide crackdown on speakeasies in 1929, 45 of the 786 clubs were in Harlem, a ratio that, according to Lerner, "suggests Harlem was neither ignored nor specifically targeted."

Building demolished 
The building at 169 West 133rd Street, a 2-story structure with a basement, was demolished in 2012. In 2009 and 2012, the fabric awning over the front door – dark brown with white lettering – had the words "Brown's Palace."

New building 
In 2015, on the same lot with the same address, a newly erected six-story, healthcare clinic named "The Nest" opened under the auspices of Harlem United, a New York non-profit founded in 1988 during the throes of the HIV/AIDS epidemic in New York. The Nest has exams rooms, dental operatories, a floor dedicated to behavioral health, and a floor for pediatric care. The staff uses the facility to offer primary care for the lesbian, gay, bisexual, queer, and transgender community as well as provide treatment and care for individuals with viral hepatitis. As of April 2020, leadership of Harlem United included Jacquelyn Kilmer, Chief Executive Officer; Marvin Griffith, Chairman; and Douglass J. Dukeman, Chairman of HU's Upper Room AIDS Ministry, Inc.

Other notable occupants, later 
In the 1970s, the LaRocque Bey Dance Company, founded in 1960, was listed at 169 West 133rd Street.

Anecdotes

Gallery

Other music venues in the area 
 Gee-Haw Stables (1940–1945), 160 West 132nd Street, between Seventh Avenue (Adam Clayton Powell, Jr., Boulevard) and Lenox Avenue (Malcolm X Boulevard)
 Pod's and Jerry's (1925–1948), 133rd Street
 Renaissance Ballroom & Casino (1924–1979), 2341–2349 Adam Clayton Powell Jr. Boulevard, on the east-side of the boulevard between 137th and 138th Streets
 Savoy Ballroom (1926–1958), 596 Lenox Avenue, between 140th and 141st Streets
 Smalls Paradise (1925–1980s), 2294 Seventh Avenue, at 135th Street
 St. Nick's Pub (1930s–still operating), 773 St. Nicholas Avenue, at 149th Street, in the Sugar Hill neighborhood of Harlem

Notes and references

Notes

References

External links 
 , Schomburg Center for Research in Black Culture – Archives and Rare Books Division  (alternate source – ), original Hotel Tattler

 "Interior of the Nest Club," New York Public Library, Digital Collections

1923 establishments in New York City
1933 disestablishments in New York (state)
Harlem Renaissance
Nightclubs in Manhattan
Former music venues in New York City
Defunct jazz clubs in New York City
Historically African-American theaters and music venues
Jazz clubs in Harlem
Harlem
Buildings and structures demolished in 2012
Demolished buildings and structures in Manhattan